Edward F. C. Davis (August 13, 1847 – August 6, 1895) was an American mechanical engineer, and superintendent, known as President of the American Society of Mechanical Engineers in the year 1894–95. Davies died nearly 48 years old still presiding officer from an accident while riding his horse in the Central Park of New York City.

Biography

Youth and education 
Davis was born in Chestertown, Maryland, on August 13, 1847. He received his education and graduated in 1866 at Washington College in his native State. His family connection had been mainly practitioners of law, and he had been expected to follow their example.

But a decided mechanical instinct, evinced in the construction, while a schoolboy, of a small working engine and other appliances, induced a reluctance to the law, and a strong desire to try his fortunes in the shop. Without much encouragement - from his family, he applied to several establishments, and finally was taken as apprentice in the shops and drawing-room of the Philadelphia Hydraulic Works of Brinton & Henderson.

Career 
His later service, during the twelve years before he entered upon the work which was to tell most strongly upon his development, and to give him his repute and standing, was successively with the New Castle Machine Works, New Castle, Del; Atlantic Dock Iron Works, Brooklyn ; Athens Brothers' Rolling Mill, Pottsville, Pa. ; and the Colliery Iron Works, Pottsville of the same place.

In March, 1878, Mr. Davis made an engagement with the Philadelphia & Reading Coal & Iron Company as Principal Draftsman, and later became Superintendent, and had charge of the shops where all the machinery of their extensive collieries was built and repaired. In 1890 he became Manager of the Richmond Locomotive and Machine Works, and left them in the spring of the present year to take charge of the works of C.W. Hunt Company, which are on Staten Island, near New York.

Death 
In 1895 the American Society of Mechanical Engineers wrote that for "the first time in the fifteen years of the existence of the American Society of Mechanical Engineers that body has been called to deplore the loss of its presiding officer while in active fulfilment of his duties. Mr. E. F. C. Davis, elected president at the annual meeting in December, 1894, was killed suddenly by an accident while riding his horse in the Central Park of New York City on the evening of Tuesday, August 6, 1895."

And furthermore, that the "exact nature of the disaster is not known, as he was riding alone ; but the supposition advanced is that the horse became unmanageable from some reason and fell upon his rider. Mr. Davis had long been an expert in all out-door sports, and particularly in horsemanship, which has made his untimely death from this cause so much the more a shock because a surprise and unexplainable. He was found by guardians of the park still living, but passed away without regaining consciousness."

References 

Attribution
 This article incorporates public domain material from obituaries in Transactions of the American Society of Mechanical Engineers, (1895) and Railway Locomotives and Cars, (1895)

1847 births
1895 deaths
American engineers
Washington College alumni
People from Chestertown, Maryland